This is a list of museums in the Faroe Islands.

 Kirkjubøargarður
 Listasavn Føroya
 Maritime Museum of Vágur
 Museum Husid uttan Ánna
 Myri Museum
 National Museum of the Faroe Islands
 Porkeri Museum
 Ruth Smith Art Museum
 Tvøroyri Museum
 Vágur Museum

See also 

 List of museums in Denmark
 List of museums

External links 
 Museums and galleries

 
Faroe Islands
+Faroe Islands
Museums